Web of Deception is a 1994 American made-for-television thriller film directed by Richard A. Colla.

Plot 
Forensic psychologist Philip Benesch (Powers Boothe) finds himself framed for the apparent murder of disturbed court stenographer Corrie Calvin (Lisa Collins). When Benesch rebuffs Calvin's advances, she stalks him, showing up on his ferry ride home, and crashing his daughter Alexandra's (Jennifer Founds) 7th birthday party in a pink bunny suit.

While Benesch has a history of serial philandering, his desire to reconcile with his wife Ellen (Pam Dawber) drives him to reject Calvin's attempts to kindle a romance. Calvin then weaves a web of deception, stealing a handkerchief with Benesch's blood, letters he has written to previous paramours, a coffee mug with his fingerprints, and the gun from his desk. After confiding false evidence of a torrid love affair to her shrink, she shoots herself with Benesch's gun.

With the aide of defense attorney Larry Lake (Bradley Whitford) and police detective Fracinetti (Paul Ben-Victor) Benesch uses his psychiatric knowledge to unravel the nefarious web.

Cast 
 Powers Boothe as Philip Benesch
 Pam Dawber as Ellen Benesch
 Lisa Collins as Corrie Calvin
 Paul Ben-Victor as detective Fracinetti
 Rosalind Chao as Dr. Sheila Prosser
 Brian Markinson as Earl Stage
 Jarion Monroe as Dr. Mike Dunn
 Anni Long as Rose Hempel
 Bradley Whitford as Larry Lake

References

External links

1994 television films
1994 films
1990s thriller films
NBC network original films
Films directed by Richard A. Colla
American thriller television films
1990s American films